Omar Moallim Nur is a commander of Ahlu Sunna Waljama'a in Banaadir region in Somalia.

References

Ethnic Somali people
Sufi teachers
Year of birth missing (living people)
Place of birth missing (living people)
Living people